In music, Op. 58 stands for Opus number 58. Compositions that are assigned this number include:

 Beethoven – Piano Concerto No. 4
 Bliss – Piano Concerto
 Britten – Songs from the Chinese
 Bruch – Violin Concerto No. 3
 Chopin – Piano Sonata No. 3
 Dvořák – Stabat Mater
 Glazunov – Symphony No. 6
 Madetoja – Okon Fuoko
 Mendelssohn – Cello Sonata No. 2
 Milhaud – Le bœuf sur le toit
 Nápravník – Dubrovsky
 Nielsen – Commotio
 Prokofiev – Cello Concerto
 Saint-Saëns – Violin Concerto No. 2
 Schumann – Sketches for Organ or Pedal Piano (Skizzen für Orgel oder Pedalklavier)
 Strauss – Elektra
 Tchaikovsky – Manfred Symphony